The women's skeleton at the 2002 Winter Olympics took place on 20 February, at the Utah Olympic Park.

Results

References

2002 women's skeleton results

Skeleton at the 2002 Winter Olympics
2002 in women's sport
Women's events at the 2002 Winter Olympics